Trinkets is an American teen drama streaming television series, based on the 2013 novel of the same name by Kirsten Smith. The series was created by Smith, Amy Andelson, and Emily Meyer. It was released on Netflix on June 14, 2019. In July 2019, the series was renewed for a second and final season which was released on August 25, 2020.

Plot
Elodie Davis, Moe Truax, and Tabitha Foster become friends after finding each other at a Shoplifters Anonymous meeting. The characters have different personalities and personas in school, keeping their friendship a secret: Elodie is an introvert; Moe favors punk style; while Tabitha comes from a wealthy family. They form a deep bond after finding out that they all have a shoplifting habit. Each also finds in the others strength as they navigate their own problems such as family and school issues.

Cast and characters

Main
 Brianna Hildebrand as Elodie Davis, a socially awkward teenage kleptomaniac who moves from Albuquerque, New Mexico, to Portland, Oregon, to live with her father, his new wife, and stepbrother after the death of her mother. She has trouble adjusting to her new life with her father but forms a close bond with Moe and Tabitha for support.
 Kiana Madeira as Moe Truax, an academically talented teenager from a financially challenged family who also attends SA meetings. She has commitment and trust issues due to an absent father with a criminal record but is fiercely loyal to her mother and manages to form a close bond with Elodie and Tabitha for support. She has a secret, romantic relationship with Noah Simos.
 Quintessa Swindell as Tabitha Foster, a fellow kleptomaniac who comes from a wealthy family. She struggles with who she is supposed to be to please everyone and who she wants to be to make herself happy, but the close bond she has with Moe and Elodie helps her come to terms.
 Brandon Butler as Brady Finch, Tabitha's abusive on-again, off-again boyfriend who uses her father's connection to Stanford to help himself and eventually blackmails Tabitha into a relationship. He is on the soccer team with Noah.
 Odiseas Georgiadis as Noah Simos, Moe's love interest whose relationship with Moe is secret. He was supportive of Moe and her academic achievements and wishes to be public with their relationship. He is on the soccer team with Brady and unaware of Brady's abusiveness towards Tabitha.
 Larry Sullivan as Doug Davis, Elodie's father who pushes her to attend SA meetings.
 Dana Green as Jenna, Elodie's stepmother.
 Linden Ashby as Whit Foster (season 2; recurring season 1), Tabitha's father who is having an affair and tries to help Brady in his Stanford application.
 October Moore as Vicky Truax (season 2; recurring season 1), Moe's mother.

Recurring
 Henry Zaga as Luca Novak, Tabitha's love interest and fellow SA attender. He previously was involved with Sabine, but Luca broke it off because it wasn't healthy.
 Parker Hall as Spencer, Jenna's son and Elodie's younger stepbrother
 Jessica Lynn Skinner as Kayla Landis, Tabitha's friend.
 Haley Tju as Rachelle Cohen-Strauss
 Katrina Cunningham as Sabine, Elodie's love interest and a rising singer. She was previously involved with Luca, but Luca broke it off because Sabine was all consuming.
 Joy Bryant as Lori Foster, Tabitha's mother who is obsessed with her online presence and how she and her family are presented online.
 Jacob Skidmore as AJ 
 Andrew Jacobs as Ben Truax (season 2), Moe's older brother and Tabitha's love interest
 Chloë Levine as Jillian (season 2), Elodie's new love interest
 Austin Crute as Marquise (season 2)
 Nik Dodani as Chase (season 2)
 Bryce Earheart as Druggie Dave (season 1)

Guest stars
 Larisa Oleynik as Shawn, a fellow kleptomaniac in the SA meetings
 Andrew Keegan as Danny Truax, Moe's deadbeat father 
 Emmett Pearson-Brown as Jake Dunford, guidance counselor
 Michael Cojocaru as Guy with Keg

Production

Development
On October 15, 2018, Netflix announced that it had given the production a series order. It also announced that Linda Gase would serve as showrunner, writers would include Amy Andelson, Emily Meyer, and Kirsten “Kiwi” Smith and that Sara St. Onge would direct the first two episodes of the series. On July 29, 2019, the series was renewed for a second and final season.

Casting
Alongside the initial series order announcement, it was announced that Brianna Hildebrand, Kiana Madeira, Quintessa Swindell, Larry Sullivan, Brandon Butler, Odiseas Georgiadis, Henry Zaga, October Moore, and Larisa Oleynik would star in the series. On October 22, 2019, it was reported that Austin Crute, Nik Dodani, Andrew Jacobs, Chloë Levine were cast in recurring roles for the second season.

Episodes

Season 1 (2019)

Season 2 (2020)

Release
On May 30, 2019, the official trailer was released. The first season was released on Netflix on June 14, 2019. On August 13, 2020, the trailer for the second season was released. The second season was released on August 25, 2020.

Reception
On review aggregator Rotten Tomatoes, the first season  has an approval rating of 56% with an average rating of 8/10, based on 9 reviews.

References

External links
 
 

2010s American high school television series
2010s American LGBT-related drama television series
2010s American teen drama television series
2019 American television series debuts
2020 American television series endings
2020s American high school television series
2020s American LGBT-related drama television series
2020s American teen drama television series
Awesomeness (company)
English-language Netflix original programming
Television series about teenagers
Television shows based on American novels
Television shows filmed in Oregon
Television shows set in Portland, Oregon
Theft in fiction